Kott or Kött is a surname of German, Polish, Czech, and also Yiddish origins.

Alexander Kott (born 1973), Russian director
Christoph Florentius Kött (1801–1873), German bishop 
Gary Kott (born 1947), American television writer
Jan Kott (1914–2001), Polish writer
Micheal Kott (born 1961), American actor
Pete Kott (born 1949), American politician
Phillip Kott (born 1952), American statistician
Wilhelmina Kott (1880–1994), American supercentenarian

See also
Kott language, an extinct language in Russia
Kot

References

German-language surnames
Polish-language surnames
Czech-language surnames
Jewish surnames